Massart is a Belgian surname. Notable people with the surname include:

Dave Massart (1919–1993), English professional footballer 
Jean Massart (1865–1925), Belgian botanist
Lambert Massart (1811–1892), Belgian violinist.
Lucien Massart (1908–1988), Belgian scientist

See also
MassArt, the Massachusetts College of Art and Design
Mass art

Surnames